Ajuchitlán  is one of the 81 municipalities of Guerrero, in southwestern Mexico. The municipal seat lies at Ajuchitlán. The municipality covers an area of 1983.6 km².

In 2005, the municipality had a total population of 37,475.

References

Municipalities of Guerrero